The Universidad Anáhuac México (Anahuac University) is a private educational institution of higher learning in Mexico, located on two campuses:
North Campus, in Huixquilucan de Degollado
South Campus, in Mexico City

These two campuses were independent institutions until August 11, 2016, when they merged to form the Universidad Anáhuac México.

The university belongs to the Catholic religious congregation of the Legionaries of Christ. Anáhuac means "near the water" in Nahuatl, the ancient Aztec language spoken in Tenochtitlan, which used to be the biggest and most crowded place in Central America, what is now Mexico City, the home of the university.

Overview 
 Name: "Anahuac" means “near the water”. The name passed on to the whole network because of the location of the first university in the network, the campus "Universidad Anahuac Mexico Norte" located in the area of Lomas Anahuac in Interlomas in Mexico City. Symbolically, the name refers to "the lake region that gave central place at the Aztec capital: Tenochtitlán, America's most populous and largest cultural development, where the City of Mexico now stands and in it, the university "
 Motto: “Vince In Bono Malum”, or "defeat evil with good", is the philosophy of the institution.
 Coat of arm/logo: The emblem of the Universidad Anahuac shows a woven fabric. As a fabric is made up of many threads, education in Anahuac University seeks to combine the students’ talents and integrate them fully into their work life.

Organization

Background and scope of the institution 
Universidad Anahuac México is part of the Anahuac Universities Network, an international network of Catholic universities led by the Legionaries of Christ, which share a mission and an educational model. It is made up of universities at an international level with ten institutions in Mexico, one in Chile, one in Spain, two in Italy and two more in United States. In addition, the Virtual University Anahuac serves corporate clients from twenty-five virtual institutional offices located throughout the world.

The Anahuac Universities Network shares the international education system of the Legion of Christ called the Education Consortium Anáhuac (CEA) in 18 countries and serving over 100,000 students from kindergarten to graduate school.

College life

ASUA (Social Action of Universidad Anahuac)
Its mission is to help the students create a spirit of Positive Leadership Action for social improvement for people with physical, spiritual or human needs. This is done by creating and promoting social development projects through the support of students, alumni, faculty and administration.

FESAL (Federation of Student Societies) 
The aim of the Federation of Student Societies is to promote, organize and direct participation of students in the activities of the Schools of the Universidad Anahuac.

Anáhuac Day 
FESAL organizes Anáhuac Day, a day of integration for the university community, which includes students, teachers, managers and administrative staff through cultural activities, sports and recreation.

Anáhuac Excellence Program

VÉRTICE (Excellence Program) 
VÉRTICE is Anáhuac's Honors Program. The program is available some of the best students at Anáhuac. About 80 students from every class are chosen among all the undergraduate programs, because of their talent and intellectual capacity. The program's students participate in activities aimed at maximization of their capabilities and leadership potential.

Vértice includes curricular courses, teamwork activities, extracurricular events and one-on-one tutors to develop every student's potential to the best of their abilities.

The program was founded by Luis Alverde, now General Dean at Anáhuac Querétaro and Javier Vargas, who served as a vice-dean for Anáhuac during Vertice's foundation.

Vértice was the first Leadership and Excellence Program at Anáhuac University, and from it other 8 Programs were born, with the objective of developing leadership skills in every student at the University.

Anáhuac Leadership Programs 
Anahuac University has created and manages the Anahuac Leadership Programs. Students enrolled in the programs have meetings to allow them to come into contact with political, cultural, sports, academics, business and social leaders. They participate in national and international training seminars.

They take part in activities such as meetings, meals and weekends away to strengthen their relationships and their integration with the group. Visits to museums and cultural institutions are organized for them to broaden their knowledge and professional horizons.

They work as teams in social projects developed by them to help and provide welfare to others.

CIMA (Administrative Leadership Program) 
CIMA is the University Leadership Program designed to allow students to engage with other young people through training.

The program provides the training to increase their organizational skills and teamwork as well as an education in human values focused on developing Positive Action Leadership.

IMPULSA (Social Leadership) 
IMPULSA is the Leadership Program of Social Sciences allowing students to run projects for the transformation of society.

GENERA (Business Leadership Program)
The Business Leadership Program forms entrepreneurs with a global vision and with a commitment to ethics and society. Its aim is to understand the business world and together with key business leaders who drive the Mexican economy to prepare to compete with Positive Action Leadership in human values. Its members meet with national and international businessmen. The program teaches business ethics and behaviour as a future business leader.

ACTION (Sports Leadership)
The Sports Leadership program is for the education of students with outstanding athletic performance and leadership. It is made up of students from the teams representing the university. ACTION students participate in sporting events and meet top athletes, as well as visit sports institutions in Mexico and the world.

CREA (Leadership Program in Communication)
CREA is the Leadership Program in Communication to train and develop the students in the School of Communication.

Students learn communication, group management, public speaking and debate, professional training, public relations and the commitment and responsibility as future opinion leaders.

Students who are part of CREA learn about the media world, and meet its key players and personalities.

CULMEN (Leadership Program in Arts and Culture)
CULMEN is a development program that teaches students the skills of creativity, innovation, talent and commitment in the field of arts and culture. CULMEN students graduate with a knowledge of culture and the arts.

Sports 
The sports department promotes sport among students and across the Anahuac community. The mascot of the university is a lion that symbolically reflects the virtues of athletes, who by training, constantly develop the skill, ability, speed and intelligence.

History

Universidad Anáhuac Mexico Norte Campus
The North Campus (subsequently Universidad Anahuac Mexico Norte) emerged in 1964 as a key element in the educational project of the Legionaries of Christ and the founding of the congregation by Father Marcial Maciel LC. Activities started in a house located in Lomas Virreyes and enrolled forty-eight students in two degrees: Business Administration and Economics. Under the stewardship of Father Faustino Pardo LC, opened in the following years: Psychology and Human Sciences in 1965, Architecture and Law in 1966. In parallel, thanks to the support of Mexican businessmen, began the construction of new facilities at Lomas Anahuac.

In 1968 the first students graduated from Anahuac, and a new campus opened on June 4.

In 1981 the government gave the university the Law of Autonomy and Validez Oficial de Estudios.
 
It now occupies an area of 220,000 square metres. It includes five cafeterias, six auditoriums, one chapel, one exposition center, 175 classrooms, 27 laboratories, 21 workshops, and 18 computer labs.

The sports facilities are highly developed. It has  basketball, volleyball, tennis, padel, soccer, indoor, and football courts.

Universidad Anáhuac México Sur
Anáhuac del Sur University opened on September 7, 1981, offering the following academic courses: Business Administration, Tourism Business, Industrial Relations, Graphic Design and Industrial Engineering. It subsequently became Universidad Anáhuac México Sur and then the South Campus  of the Universidad Anáhuac México.

On the first day of the University, Father Faustino Pardo, L.C., founder dean of the  University said: "In hope that the seed that we plant in this hill today, germinates and gives abundant fruits for the well being of our youth, and the well being of Mexico."

It had institutional accreditation by:
 SEP,  Academic Excellence 2007
 FIMPES,  Federation of Mexican Private Higher Education Institutions 2009

Honoris Causa Doctorates
In this 30 years the University has given this award to:
 Lech Walesa 1996
 Thomas Stanford 1998
 Fernando Landeros 2006
 Carlos Abascal 2008
 Mauricio Beuchot 2012

Notable alumni 
 Antonio Chavez Trejo, filmmaker, writer, producer and entrepreneur
 Sergio Albert, former NFL player
 Alfredo Elías Ayub, public sector career
 Álvaro Corcuera, catholic priest
 Beatriz Peschard Mijares, architect
 Álvaro Zardoni, sculptor

External links 
 Official website of Anahuac Universities Network
 Universidad Anahuac Mexico Norte
 Universidad Anahuac Online
 Universidad Anáhuac México Sur 

Educational institutions established in 1964
State of Mexico
Regnum Christi
Legion of Christ
Anahuac universities
Anahuac Mexico Norte
1964 establishments in Mexico